"Cien Años" is a Mexican song written by Rubén Fuentes and Alberto Cervantes. Several artists have recorded this song, Pedro Infante in the 1950s for example, and the singer Selena made her personal cover. The song has been released in most of Selena's packages since its 1988 release.

Background information
The song was covered by Selena's singing group in 1988, Selena y Los Dinos, on their album Preciosa (Precious). Selena re-recorded the song with a more beat-to-beat pop style in 1990, for their first greatest hits album, 16 Super Exitos Originales. After Selena's death, the song appeared as a Mariachi song for the album Siempre Selena in 1996. Again the song appeared on Selena's greatest hits album, All My Hits/Todos Mis Exitos Vol. 2 in 2000. This song has extensive history dating back to Javier Solis and Pedro Infante

Covers
Pedro Infante
Vicente Fernandez
Selena
Thalía
Pepe Aguilar
Los Tigres del Norte
Los Cenzontles & David Hidalgo (2008)
Lucero
Krystal 
Carlos Rivera and Maluma
José Feliciano

References

Selena songs
Year of song missing
2000 singles
Spanish-language songs
Mexican folk songs
Salsa songs
Songs released posthumously
Song recordings produced by A. B. Quintanilla
EMI Records singles